Traginops irroratus is a species of fly in the family Odiniidae.

References

External links

 

Odiniidae
Articles created by Qbugbot
Insects described in 1900